Bamer Kola (also Romanized as Bāmer Kolā) is a village in Dabuy-ye Jonubi Rural District, Dabudasht District, Amol County, Mazandaran Province, Iran. At the 2006 census, its population was 366, in 91 families.

References 

Populated places in Amol County